The following outline is provided as an overview of and topical guide to telecommunication:

Telecommunication – the transmission of signals over a distance for the purpose of communication. In modern times, this process almost always involves the use of electromagnetic waves by transmitters and receivers, but in earlier years it also involved the use of drums and visual signals such as smoke, fire, beacons, semaphore lines and other optical communications.

Modes of telecommunication 

 E-mail
 Fax
 Instant messaging
 Radio
 Satellite
 Telegraphy
 Telephony
 Television broadcasting
 Videoconferencing
 VoIP

Types of telecommunication networks

Telecommunications network
 Computer networks
 ARPANET
 Ethernet
 Internet
 Wireless networks
 Public switched telephone networks  (PSTN)
 Packet switched networks
 Radio network

Aspects of telecommunication transmission

Telecommunication
 Analog
 Digital
 Functional profile
 Optics

Telecommunication technology

 Modulation
 Amplitude modulation
 Frequency modulation
 Quadrature amplitude modulation
 Nyquist rate
 Nyquist ISI criterion
 Pulse shaping
 Intersymbol interference

Communications media types

 Physical media for Telecommunication
 Twisted pair
 Coaxial cable
 Optical fiber
 Telecommunication through Free Space
 Broadcast radio frequency including television and radio
 Line-of-sight
 Communications satellite
 Terrestrial Microwave
 Wireless LAN

Relationship between media and transmitters
  
 Physical access to media
 Simplex
 Duplex (telecommunications)
 Logical relationships
 Return channel
 Two-way alternating
 Two-way simultaneous

Multiple access to media

 Multiplexing
 Analog
 Frequency division multiplexing
 Space division multiplexing
 Digital
 Time-division multiplexing
 Statistical multiplexing and Packet switching
 Media Access Control
 Contention
 Token-based
 Centralized token control
 Distributed token control

History of telecommunication

History of telecommunication
 History of telegraphy
 History of the telephone
Invention of the telephone
Timeline of the telephone
 History of radio
 History of television
 History of videophones
 History of mobile phones
 History of computing hardware
 History of the Internet

Major telecommunications equipment manufacturers
 Alcatel-Lucent
 Aricent
 AT&T
 Avaya
 Ciena
 Cisco Systems
 Ericsson
 Fujitsu
 HCL Technologies
 Huawei
 NEC
Nokia
 ShoreTel
 Verizon
 ZTE

Major telecommunications service providers

 List of mobile network operators
 List of telephone operating companies

Telecommunication organizations 

 Alliance for Telecommunications Industry Solutions
 Telecommunications Industry Association

Telecommunication publications 

Magazines
Billing and OSS World
Cabling Installation & Maintenance
Call Center
Communications News
Communications System Design
Lightwave
Mobile Radio Technology (MRT)
New Telephony
Phone+
RCR Wireless News
Telecom Asia
Telecommunications Magazine
Telephony
WhatSatphone Magazine
Wireless Systems Design
Wireless Week
Xchange

Persons influential in telecommunication 

 Edwin Howard Armstrong 
 John Logie Baird 
 Paul Baran
 Alexander Graham Bell
 Tim Berners-Lee
 Jagadish Chandra Bose
 Vint Cerf
 Claude Chappe 
 Donald Davies
 Louis Pouzin
 Lee de Forest
 Philo Farnsworth 
 Reginald Fessenden
 Elisha Gray
 Innocenzo Manzetti
 Guglielmo Marconi 
 Antonio Meucci
 Alexander Stepanovich Popov
 Johann Philipp Reis
 Almon Brown Strowger
 Nikola Tesla
 Camille Tissot
 Alfred Vail 
 Charles Wheatstone 
 Vladimir K. Zworykin

See also 

List of telecommunications encryption terms
List of telecommunications terminology
List of telephony terminology

References

External links 

 International Telecommunication Union (ITU)
 ATIS Telecom Glossary 
 Communications Engineering Tutorials
 Federal Communications Commission
 IEEE Communications Society
 International Telecommunication Union
  (Ericsson removed the book from their site in September 2005)
 VoIP, Voice over Internet Protocol and Internet telephone calls
 Free Telco Dictionary

Telecommunications
Telecommunications

Telecommunications topics
 1